Ilovlya is an urban-type settlement and the administrative center of Ilovlinsky District, Volgograd Oblast, Russia. Population:

References

Notes

Sources

Urban-type settlements in Volgograd Oblast
Don Host Oblast